The Midlands Microcraton is a triangular block of late Neoproterozoic crust of igneous and volcaniclastic origin which underlies the English Midlands. Its northern tip is at the southern edge of the English Peak District and its other two corners are in the vicinity of London and Swansea. Though its northeastern edge is obscured by Palaeozoic and Mesozoic strata, the northwestern edge of the microcraton is clearly defined by the Welsh Borderland Fault System. To the south it is bounded by the Variscan Orogen.

References

Cratons
Structural geology
Geology of Europe
Geology of England
Geology of Wales